Amitabh Kant (born 1 March 1956) was the second chief executive officer of NITI Aayog, a public policy think tank of the Government of India. He is a retired member of the Indian Administrative Service (IAS), the central civil service of the Government of India.

Early life
Amitabh Kant was born on 1 March 1956. He first studied at Modern School, Delhi, graduated with a degree in Economics (Hons.) from St. Stephen's College, Delhi and earned an M.A. in International Relations from Jawaharlal Nehru University. He was a Chevening Scholar.

Career
Kant began his Indian Administrative Service career in the Kerala cadre, working as sub collector of Thalassery. India Today's High & Mighty rankings of 2019 featured Kant as one of the most powerful people in India under the category of "The Supercrats - India's Top Bureaucrats" along with other bureaucrats such as Nripendra Misra and Ajit Doval. Currently, he is an Indian delegate at the G20.

Controversies 
In December 2020, Kant attracted controversy after remarking at a public event, organized by Swarajya magazine, that enacting "tough reforms" were hard in India, since it is "too much of a democracy".

References

External links

Living people
1956 births
Indian Administrative Service officers
Chevening Scholars